Bongili is a Bantu language of the Republic of Congo.

References

Ngondi-Ngiri languages